Muhammad ibn Muhammad ibn al-Hasan al-Tūsī ( 18 February 1201 – 26 June 1274), better known as Nasir al-Din al-Tusi (or simply Tusi  in the West), was a Persian polymath, architect, philosopher, physician, scientist, and theologian. Nasir al-Din al-Tusi was a well published author, writing on subjects of math, engineering, prose, and mysticism. Additionally, al-Tusi made several scientific advancements. In astronomy, al-Tusi created very accurate tables of planetary motion, an updated planetary model, and critiques of Ptolemaic astronomy. He also made strides in logic, mathematics but especially trigonometry, biology, and chemistry. Nasir al-Din al-Tusi left behind a great legacy as well. Tusi is widely regarded as one of the greatest scientists of medieval Islam, since he is often considered the creator of trigonometry as a mathematical discipline in its own right. The  Muslim scholar Ibn Khaldun (1332–1406) considered Tusi to be the greatest of the later Persian scholars. There is also reason to believe that he may have influenced Copernican heliocentrism. Nasir proposed that humans are related to animals and that some animals have a limited level of awareness while humans have a superior level of awareness amongst animals. He also framed a very basic evolutionary theory (though markedly different from modern evolutionary theory).

Biography
Nasir al-Din al-Tusi was born in the city of Tus in medieval Khorasan (northeastern Iran) in the year 1201 and began his studies at an early age. In Hamadan and Tus, he studied the Quran, Hadith, Ja'fari jurisprudence, logic, philosophy, mathematics, medicine, and astronomy.

He was born into a Shī‘ah family and lost his father at a young age. Fulfilling the wish of his father, the young Muhammad took learning and scholarship very seriously and traveled far and wide to attend the lectures of renowned scholars and acquired knowledge, an exercise highly encouraged in his Islamic faith. At a young age, he moved to Nishapur to study philosophy under Farid al-Din Damad and mathematics under Muhammad Hasib. He met also Attar of Nishapur, the legendary Sufi master who was later killed by  the Mongols, and he attended the lectures of Qutb al-Din al-Misri.

Nasir-al-Din Tusi writes in his work, Desideratum of the Faithful (Maṭlūb al-muʾminīn),“To become people of spiritual reality, it is incumbent to fulfill the symbolic elucidation (ta'wīl) of the seven pillars of the religious law (sharīʿat)”. He also explains that fulfilling the religious law is much easier than fulfilling its spiritual interpretation.

He explains in his book Aghaz u anjam that the sacred accounts of history that we perceive within the bounds of space and time symbolize events that have no such restrictions. They are only expressed in this way so that humans are able to comprehend them.

In Mosul, al-Tusi studied mathematics and astronomy with Kamal al-Din Yunus (d. AH 639 / AD 1242), a pupil of Sharaf al-Dīn al-Ṭūsī. Later on he corresponded with Sadr al-Din al-Qunawi, the son-in-law of Ibn Arabi, and it seems that mysticism, as propagated by Sufi masters of his time, was not appealing to him. Once the occasion was suitable, he composed his own manual of philosophical Sufism in the form of a small booklet entitled Awsaf al-Ashraf, or "The Attributes of the Illustrious".

As the armies of Genghis Khan swept his homeland, he was employed by the Nizari Ismaili state and, while moving from stronghold to stronghold, made his most important contributions in science, first in those of the Quhistan region under Muhtasham Nasir al-Din Abd al-Rahim ibn Abi Mansur (where he wrote the Nasirean Ethics). He was later sent to the major castles of Alamut and Maymun-Diz to continue his career under Nizari Imam Ala al-Din Muhammad. He was captured after the fall of Maymun-Diz to the Mongol forces under Hulagu Khan.

Nasir al-Din Tusi’s autobiography, The Voyage (Sayr wa-Suluk) explains that a literary devastation such as the devastation of the Alamūt libraries in 1256 would not waver the spirit of the Nizari Ismaili community because they give more importance to the “living book” (the Imam of the Time) rather than the “written word”. Their hearts are attached to the Commander of the Believers (amir al-mu'minin), not just the “command” itself. There is always a present living Imam in world, and following him, a believer will never go astray.

Role during the Mongol invasion of Baghdad 
In 1256 al-Tusi was in the castle of Alamut when it was attacked by the forces of the Mongol leader Hulegu, a grandson of Genghis Khan. Some sources claim that al-Tusi betrayed the defences of Alamut to the invading Mongols. After Hulegu's forces destroyed Alamut and, Hulegu himself being interested in the natural sciences, treated al-Tusi with great respect, appointing him as their scientific adviser and becoming a permanent member of his inner council. To great controversy, it is widely assumed Tusi was with the Mongol forces under Hulegu when they attacked and massacred the inhabitants of Baghdad in 1258 and he played an essential role in ending of the Quraysh Empire.
Soon after, he was given the full authority of administering the finances of religious foundations, and visited many of the Shi'ii shrines once the siege of Baghdad was over.  Being in a position of power, Tusi was able to champion the Twelver Shia cause throughout Persia and Iraq.

Works
Tusi has about 150 works, of which 25 are in Persian and the remaining are in Arabic, and there is one treatise in Persian, Arabic and Turkish.

 Sayr wa-Suluk (The Voyage) - Autobiography
 Kitāb al-Shakl al-qattāʴ  Book on the complete quadrilateral. A five-volume summary of trigonometry.
 Al-Tadhkirah fi'ilm al-hay'ah – A memoir on the science of astronomy. Many commentaries were written about this work called Sharh al-Tadhkirah (A Commentary on al-Tadhkirah) - Commentaries were written by Abd al-Ali ibn Muhammad ibn al-Husayn al-Birjandi and by Nazzam Nishapuri.
 Akhlaq-i Nasiri – A work on ethics.
 al-Risalah al-Asturlabiyah – A Treatise on the astrolabe.
 Zij-i Ilkhani (Ilkhanic Tables) – A major astronomical treatise, completed in 1272.
 Sharh al-Isharat (Commentary on Avicenna's Isharat)
 Awsaf al-Ashraf a short mystical-ethical work in Persian.
 Tajrīd al-Iʿtiqād (Summation of Belief) – A commentary on Shia doctrines.
 Talkhis al-Muhassal (summary of summaries).
 Maṭlūb al-muʾminīn (Desideratum of the Faithful)
 Aghaz u anjam - Esoteric interpretation of the Quran

An example from one of his poems:
Anyone who knows, and knows that he knows,
makes the steed of intelligence leap over the vault of heaven.
Anyone who does not know but knows that he does not know,
can bring his lame little donkey to the destination nonetheless.
Anyone who does not know, and does not know that he does not know,
is stuck forever in double ignorance.

Achievements

During his stay in Nishapur, Tusi established a reputation as an exceptional scholar. Tusi’s prose writing, which numbers over 150 works, represent one of the largest collections by a single Islamic author. Writing in both Arabic and Persian, Nasir al-Din Tusi dealt with both religious ("Islamic") topics and non-religious or secular subjects ("the ancient sciences"). His works include the definitive Arabic versions of the works of Euclid, Archimedes, Ptolemy, Autolycus, and Theodosius of Bithynia.

Astronomy

Tusi convinced Hulegu Khan to construct an observatory for establishing accurate astronomical tables for better astrological predictions. Beginning in 1259, the Rasad Khaneh observatory was constructed in Azarbaijan, south of the river Aras, and to the west of Maragheh, the capital of the Ilkhanate Empire.

Based on the observations in this for the time being most advanced observatory, Tusi made very accurate tables of planetary movements as depicted in his book Zij-i ilkhani (Ilkhanic Tables). This book contains astronomical tables for calculating the positions of the planets and the names of the stars. His model for the planetary system is believed to be the most advanced of his time, and was used extensively until the development of the heliocentric model in the time of Nicolaus Copernicus. Between Ptolemy and Copernicus, he is considered by many to be one of the most eminent astronomers of his time. His famous student Shams al-Din al-Bukhari was the teacher of Byzantine scholar Gregory Chioniades, who had in turn trained astronomer Manuel Bryennios about 1300 in Constantinople.

For his planetary models, he invented a geometrical technique called a Tusi-couple, which generates linear motion from the sum of two circular motions. He used this technique to replace Ptolemy's problematic equant for many planets, but was unable to find a solution to Mercury, which was solved later by Ibn al-Shatir as well as Ali Qushji.  The Tusi couple was later employed in Ibn al-Shatir's geocentric model and Nicolaus Copernicus' heliocentric Copernican model. He also calculated the value for the annual precession of the equinoxes and contributed to the construction and usage of some astronomical instruments including the astrolabe.

Ṭūsī criticized Ptolemy's use of observational evidence to show that the Earth was at rest, noting that such proofs were not decisive. Although it doesn't mean that he was a supporter of mobility of the earth, as he and his 16th-century commentator al-Bīrjandī, maintained that the earth's immobility could be demonstrated, only by physical principles found in natural philosophy. Tusi's criticisms of Ptolemy were similar to the arguments later used by Copernicus in 1543 to defend the Earth's rotation.

About the real essence of the Milky Way, Ṭūsī in his Tadhkira writes:
"The Milky Way, i.e. the galaxy, is made up of a very large number of small, tightly-clustered stars, which, on account of their concentration and smallness, seem to be cloudy patches. because of this, it was likened to milk in color."

Three centuries later the proof of the Milky Way consisting of many stars came in 1610 when Galileo Galilei used a telescope to study the Milky Way and discovered that it is really composed of a huge number of faint stars.

Logic
Nasir al-Din Tusi was a supporter of Avicennian logic, and wrote the following commentary on Avicenna's theory of absolute propositions:

Mathematics

Al-Tusi was the first to write a work on trigonometry independently of astronomy. Al-Tusi, in his Treatise on the Quadrilateral, gave an extensive exposition of spherical trigonometry, distinct from astronomy. It was in the works of Al-Tusi that trigonometry achieved the status of an independent branch of pure mathematics distinct from astronomy, to which it had been linked for so long.

He was the first to list the six distinct cases of a right triangle in spherical trigonometry.

This followed earlier work by Greek mathematicians such as Menelaus of Alexandria, who wrote a book on spherical trigonometry called Sphaerica, and the earlier Muslim mathematicians Abū al-Wafā' al-Būzjānī and Al-Jayyani.

In his On the Sector Figure, appears the famous Sine Law for plane triangles.

He also stated the sine law for spherical triangles, discovered the law of tangents for spherical triangles, and provided proofs for these laws.

Color theory
While Aristotle (d. 322 BCE) had suggested that all colors can be aligned on a single line from black to white, Ibn-Sina (d. 1037) described that there were three paths from black to white, one path via grey, a second path via red and the third path via green. Al-Tusi (ca. 1258) stated that there are no less than five of such paths, via lemon (yellow), blood (red), pistachio (green), indigo (blue) and grey. This text, which was copied in the Middle East numerous times until at least the nineteenth century as part of the textbook Revision of the Optics (Tanqih al-Manazir) by Kamal al-Din al-Farisi (d. 1320), made color space effectively two-dimensional. 
Robert Grosseteste (d. 1253) proposed an effectively three-dimensional model of color space.

Biology
In his Akhlaq-i Nasiri, Tusi wrote about several biological topics. He defended a version of Aristotle's scala naturae, in which he placed man above animals, plants, minerals, and the elements. He described "grasses which grow without sowing or cultivation, by the mere mingling of elements," as closest to minerals. Among plants, he considered the date-palm as the most highly developed, since "it only lacks one thing further to reach (the stage of) an animal: to tear itself loose from the soil and to move away in the quest for nourishment."

The lowest animals "are adjacent to the region of plants: such are those animals which propagate like grass, being incapable of mating [...], e.g. earthworms, and certain insects". The animals "which reach the stage of perfection [...] are distinguished by fully developed weapons", such as antlers, horns, teeth, and claws. Tusi described these organs as adaptations to each species's lifestyle, in a way anticipating natural theology. He continued:

Thus, in this paragraph, Tusi described different types of learning, recognising observational learning as the most advanced form, and correctly attributing it to certain animals.

Tusi seems to have perceived man as belonging to the animals, since he stated that "the Animal Soul [comprising the faculties of perception and movement ...] is restricted to individuals of the animal species", and that, by possessing a "Human Soul, [...] mankind is distinguished and particularized among other animals."

Some scholars have interpreted Tusi's biological writings as suggesting that he adhered to some kind of evolutionary theory. However, Tusi did not state explicitly that he believed species to change over time.

Chemistry
Tusi contributed to the field of chemistry, stating an early law of conservation of mass. Al-Tusi's theory of chemical transformation was based on the idea that substances could be transformed into other substances through chemical reactions, but that the total mass of the substances involved in the reaction would remain constant. This idea was a precursor to the law of conservation of mass, which states that the total mass of a closed system remains constant during a chemical reaction. Al-Tusi believed that chemical transformations were governed by natural laws and that they could be understood through observation, experimentation, and logical reasoning.

Philosophy 
Tusi contributed many writings to the topic of philosophy. Amongst his philosophical work are his disagreements with fellow philosopher Avicenna. His most famous philosophical work is Akhlaq-i nasiri or Nasirean Ethics in English. Within this work he discusses and compares Islamic teachings to the ethics of Aristotle and Plato. Tusi's book became a popular ethical work in the Muslim world, specifically in India and Persia. Tusi's work also left an impact on Shi'ite Islamic theology. His book Targid also called Catharsis is significant in Shi'ite theology. He also contributed five works to the subject of logic; which were highly regarded by his contemporaries and achieved notoriety in the Muslim world.

Influence and legacy
A 60-km diameter lunar crater located on the southern hemisphere of the moon is named after him as "Nasireddin". A minor planet 10269 Tusi discovered by Soviet astronomer Nikolai Stepanovich Chernykh in 1979 is named after him. The K. N. Toosi University of Technology in Iran and Observatory of Shamakhy in the Republic of Azerbaijan are also named after him. In February 2013, Google celebrated his 812th birthday with a doodle, which was accessible in its websites with Arabic language calling him al-farsi (the Persian). His birthday is also celebrated as Engineer's Day in Iran.

Possible Influence on Nicolaus Copernicus 
Some scholars believe that Nicolaus Copernicus may have been influenced by Middle Eastern astronomers due to uncanny similarities between his work and the uncited work of these Islamic scholars, including Nasir al-Din al-Tusi, Ibn al-Shatir, Muayyad al-Din al-Urdi, and Qutb al-Din al-Shirazi. al-Tusi specifically, the plagiarism in question comes from similarities in the Tusi couple and Copernicus' geometric method of removing the Equant from mathematical astronomy. Not only do both of the methods match geometrically, however, more importantly they both use the same exact lettering system for each vertex; a detail that seems too preternatural to be happenstance. Moreover, the fact that several other details of his model also mirror other Islamic scholars bolsters the notion that Copernicus' work may not have been only his own.

There is no evidence that any of the direct work of Nasir al-Din al-Tusi ever made it to Copernicus, however there is evidence that the mathematics and theories did make the journey to Europe. There were Jewish scientists and pilgrims who would make the journey from the Middle East to Europe, bringing with them Middle Eastern scientific ideas to share with their Christian counterparts. While acknowledging that this is not direct evidence that Copernicus has access to al-Tusi's work, it does show that it was possible.  There was just such a Jewish scholar by the name of  Abner of Burgos who wrote a book containing an incomplete version of the Tusi couple that he had learned second hand, which could have been found by Copernicus. It is important to note that his version had no proofs of the geometry either, so if Copernicus had obtained this book he would have had to complete both the proof and mechanism. Additionally, some scholars believe that, if not Jewish thinkers, it could have been transmission from the Islamic school in Maragheh, home to Nasir al-Din al-Tusi's observatory to Muslim Spain. From Spain, al-Tusi and other Islamic cosmological theories could spread through Europe. Spread of Islamic astronomy from Maragheh Observatory into Europe could have also been possible in the form of Greek translations from Gregory Choniades. There is evidence as to the means of Copernicus acquiring the Tusi couple and suspicious similarities, not only in math but in visual details as well.

Despite this circumstantial evidence, there is still no direct proof that Copernicus did plagiarize the work of Nasir al-Din al-Tusi, and if he did that he did so intentionally. The Tusi couple is not a unique principle, and as the equant was a problematic necessity to preserve circular motion it is possible that more than one astronomer wished to improve on it; to that end, some scholars argue it would not be difficult for an astronomer to use Euclid's own work to derive the Tusi couple on their own, and that Copernicus most likely did this instead of stealing. Before Copernicus ever published the work on his geometrical mechanism, he had written at length his dissatisfaction over Ptolemaic astronomy and the use of the equant, so some scholars then purport that it was not unfounded for Copernicus to have rederived the Tusi couple without having seen it as he had clear motive to do so. Also, some scholars that argue Copernicus did commit plagiarism say that by never claiming it as his own, he inherently condemns himself. However, others critique that mathematicians do not normally claim work like other scientists, so declaring a theorem for oneself is an exception and not the norm. Therefore, there is motive and some explanation as to why and how Copernicus did not plagiarize, despite the evidence against him.

See also

 List of Iranian scientists
 List of Shi'a Muslims
 Persian science
 Science in the medieval Islamic world
 Shen Kuo

References

Further reading
 
 
 Encyclopædia Iranica, "AḴLĀQ-E NĀṢERĪ", G.M. Wickens Encyclopædia Iranica | Articles
 Encyclopædia Iranica, "AWṢĀF AL-AŠRĀF", G.M. Wickens Welcome to Encyclopaedia Iranica
 Encyclopædia Iranica, "Nasir al-Din al-Tusi" George Saliba Welcome to Encyclopaedia Iranica

External links

  (PDF version)
 
 Biography by Islamic Insights
 Biography by Islamic Philosophy Online
 Biography by The Internet Encyclopedia of Philosophy
 Islam Online.
 The Rekhaganita. An 18th century Sanskrit translation of Nasir al-Din al-Tusi's recension of Euclid's Elements.
 Richard Covington, Rediscovering Arabic Science, 2007, Saudi Aramco World

People from Tus, Iran
Scientists who worked on qibla determination
Iranian Shia scholars of Islam
1201 births
1274 deaths
13th-century Iranian astronomers
13th-century Iranian mathematicians
13th-century Iranian philosophers
13th-century Muslim scholars of Islam
Iranian ethicists
Scholars of the Ilkhanate
13th-century inventors
13th-century Shia Muslims
Astronomers of the medieval Islamic world